Bonita (Spanish for "Beautiful") is a census-designated place (CDP) in southern San Diego County, California, nestled between the cities of Chula Vista, National City, and San Diego. The population was 12,538 at the 2010 census.

Geography  

While Bonita is politically designated as an unincorporated community, bounded by the incorporated cities of Chula Vista, San Diego and National City, it is closely associated with the geography of the Lower Sweetwater Valley. Thus considered, Bonita occupies about a five-mile (8 kilometer) stretch of the Sweetwater River, its valley, and surrounding hills on either side, bounded upstream (east) by the Sweetwater Reservoir, and downstream (west) effectively by Interstate 805.  The community crosses west of I-805—an area less than —reaching as far south and west as East H Street and Hilltop Drive. Its northern boundary is State Route 54 and its southern extent reaches approximately one-mile (1.6 km) south of the river.

Large portions of modern Bonita consist of housing tracts built throughout the 1960s, 1970s, and 1980s, including:
 Bonita Verde Estates
 Bonita Downs
 Bonita Fairways
 Bonita Glen
 Bonita Highlands
 Bonita Long Canyon
 Bonita Woods
 Bonita Woods Park
 Emerald Ranch
 Lynwood Hills
 Ames Ranch
 Villas de Bonita
 Rancho Robinhood

The Bonita area is populated by coyote, racoon, fox, rabbit, squirrel, bobcat, opossum, and skunk, among other wildlife.

History 

Before the arrival of the Spanish, Kumeyaay lived in the area around Sweetwater Valley, and called it Apusquel. After the establishment of Mission San Diego de Alcalá, the valley was used for cattle raising but was not significantly settled. After gaining independence from the Spanish Empire, the valley became part of a land grant awarded to John (Don Juan) Forster.  The word Bonita is a feminine word for "pretty" in the Spanish language. It was the name of a ranch owned by Henry Ernest Cooper, Sr. in 1884, and was used by the nearby post office. The ranch itself was used to cultivate lemons, which were first grown in the area beginning in 1871. During the early years lemon industry was thriving, where it became the originator of the Bonnie Brae Lemon variety, named after the first lemon ranch in the community.

In 1888, the Sweetwater Dam was built, creating the Sweetwater Reservoir and forever changing the geography of the region. Soon after, in 1906, the dam broke as a result of extensive rains which overfilled the reservoir, and the Lower Sweetwater Valley was completely flooded.

Bonita has experienced minor flooding throughout history, generally as a result of high seasonal rains attributed to El Niño. The floods most affect the Central Avenue river crossing, as no bridge has ever been built, unlike the Bonita Road and Willow Road crossings which are bridges, the former of which was rebuilt in the late 1990s.

In the 1990s and 2000s, the development of State Route 125 (The South Bay Expressway) became a major issue to Bonita residents, much as Interstate 805 and State Route 54 did during their development. Opponents argued that Bonita's rural nature would be compromised without benefit while proponents argued that the highway would reduce the significant increase in surface-street car traffic the community had seen since the 1980s when the eastern Chula Vista communities surrounding Eastlake were developed. The tollway opened in November 2007 and sought Chapter 11 bankruptcy on March 22, 2010, when the cost of litigation over the construction of the road threatened to overwhelm its ability to operate and pay off its loans. On April 14, 2011, South Bay Expressway LP emerged from bankruptcy, and in a closed session on July 29, 2011, the SANDAG board of directors voted to purchase the lease to operate the State Route 125 toll road for approximately $345 million.

In 2007, Glen Abbey Memorial Park was declared a historic district, having been designed by architects who also worked on Balboa Park, and other landscapes and architectures that are significant to the history of San Diego. It is one of only three historic districts in unincorporated San Diego County.

The Bonita Historical Society, which operates the Bonita Museum & Cultural Center, is the principal repository of historical information for the Lower Sweetwater Valley.

Climate 

The climate in Bonita is a combination of the coastal and inland valley climates of San Diego County: warmer (and sunnier during the May Gray and June Gloom periods) than areas directly adjacent to San Diego Bay or the coast, but not as hot as communities in inland valleys such as El Cajon, or even nearby Spring Valley. In summer, Bonita's climate is pleasant.

Government 

In the San Diego County Board of Supervisors, Bonita is in District 1, which is represented by Nora Vargas.

In the California State Senate, Bonita is in California's 40th State Senate district.

Educational institutions 
The following districts serve the local Bonita community:

Elementary schools
Chula Vista Elementary School District
Ella B. Allen Elementary School
Sunnyside Elementary School
Tiffany Elementary School (Chula Vista)
Valley Vista Elementary School

Middle and high school
Sweetwater Union High School District
Bonita Vista Middle School (Chula Vista)
Bonita Vista High School (Chula Vista)

Community college
Southwestern Community College District
Southwestern College (Chula Vista)

Parks and recreation 

Bonita is considered a rural and equestrian enclave in the middle of suburbia.

To visitors and residents alike, one of the most visible features of Bonita's recreational life is the walking trail that loops the Chula Vista Municipal Golf Course in central Bonita. Hundreds of residents walk, run, and ride this trail every day for pleasure and fitness, and the trail has become a vital component of Bonita's life for many residents. During El Nino years, this golf course and surrounding walking trails have flooded, closing the golf course and preventing many residents from using the walking trails.

In the late 1990s, the Sweetwater Regional Park was expanded and significantly improved, extending the walking and equestrian trails to an even greater number, and introducing a camping area at Summit Meadow Road. Now, virtually the entire valley from the reservoir to I-805 formally serves recreational purposes as either park or golf course. Sweetwater County Park, at the intersection of Briarwood Road and Sweetwater Road, is a wildlife preserve with a small pond that supports some fishing.

Equestrianism has long been a part of the Bonita community, and many trails exist throughout the Lower Sweetwater Valley. There are several connections to trails external to Bonita as well. Many residents still keep their own horses and can be seen riding the trails regularly. The Bonita Valley Trails organization monitors and supports the network of trails throughout the valley.

The following parks serve the Bonita community:
 Rohr Park
 Sweetwater Regional Park
 Sweetwater County Park
 Sweetwater Reservoir Riding and Hiking Trail
 Bonita Golf Course
 Chula Vista Municipal Golf Course

Events 

Bonitafest is an annual community event, held in early autumn, highlighted by a parade and street fair along Bonita Road which includes crafts, music, entertainment, and food. The Kiwanis Club hosts a Bonitafest Golf Tournament in conjunction with this event. At this time, there is also an annual community play called the Bonitafest Melodrama, co-founded by Max Branscomb in the 1970s.
In 2008, Bonita did not have enough funds to pay for traffic police to redirect traffic during the parade, so no parade was held during the Bonitafest.

Demographics

2010 

The 2010 United States Census reported that Bonita had a population of 12,538. The racial makeup of Bonita was 8,382 (66.9%) White (43.0% non-Hispanic White), 466 (3.7%) African American, 109 (0.9%) Native American, 1,200 (9.6%) Asian, 80 (0.6%) Pacific Islander, 1,681 (13.4%) from other races, and 620 (4.9%) from two or more races. Hispanic or Latino of any race were 5,106 persons (40.7%).

The Census reported that 12,505 people (99.7% of the population) lived in households, 33 (0.3%) lived in non-institutionalized group quarters, and 0 (0%) were institutionalized.

There were 4,288 households, out of which 1,401 (32.7%) had children under the age of 18 living in them, 2,602 (60.7%) were opposite-sex married couples living together, 510 (11.9%) had a female householder with no husband present, 203 (4.7%) had a male householder with no wife present.  There were 170 (4.0%) unmarried opposite-sex partnerships, and 25 (0.6%) same-sex married couples or partnerships. 767 households (17.9%) were made up of individuals, and 408 (9.5%) had someone living alone who was 65 years of age or older. The average household size was 2.92.  There were 3,315 families (77.3% of all households); the average family size was 3.26.

The population was spread out, with 2,612 people (20.8%) under the age of 18, 1,126 people (9.0%) aged 18 to 24, 2,706 people (21.6%) aged 25 to 44, 3,753 people (29.9%) aged 45 to 64, and 2,341 people (18.7%) who were 65 years of age or older.  The median age was 43.9 years. For every 100 females, there were 94.9 males.  For every 100 females aged 18 and over, there were 91.8 males.

The homeowner vacancy rate was 1.1%; the rental vacancy rate was 5.5%.  9,125 people (72.8% of the population) lived in owner-occupied housing units and 3,380 people (27.0%) lived in rental housing units.

2000  

 census, there were 12,401 people, 4,179 households, and 3,397 families residing in Bonita. The population density was 2,533.3 inhabitants per square mile (977.2/km2). The racial makeup of the CDP was 71.99% White, 3.11% African American, 0.56% Native American, 8.54% Asian, 0.31% Pacific Islander, 10.64% from other races, and 4.84% from two or more races. Hispanic or Latino of any race were 30.47% of the population.

There were 4,179 households, out of which 35.3% had children under the age of 18 living with them, 66.4% were married couples living together, 10.9% had a female householder with no husband present, and 18.7% were non-families. 14.0% of all households were made up of individuals, and 5.3% had someone living alone who was 65 years of age or older.  The average household size was 2.94 and the average family size was 3.22.

In Bonita, the population was spread out, with 24.4% under the age of 18, 7.3% from 18 to 24, 25.5% from 25 to 44, 28.3% from 45 to 64, and 14.5% who were 65 years of age or older.  The median age was 41 years. For every 100 females, there were 95.1 males.  For every 100 females aged 18 and over, there were 92.2 males.

The median income as of 2010 for a household in the CDP was $84,526. Males had a median income of $75,495 versus $63,653 for females. The per capita income for Bonita was $67,131.  About 2.1% of families and 3.7 of the population were below the poverty line, including 2.2% of those under age 18 and 2.0% of those aged 65 or over.

Bonita is primarily served by three elementary K-6 schools in Chula Vista Elementary School District: Ella B. Allen, Sunnyside, and Valley Vista. As of the 2007–08 school year, 1291 students were enrolled in these schools; their combined demographic makeup was 54.1% Hispanic, 23.5% non-Hispanic White, 5.7% Filipino, 3.8% African American, 1.5% Asian, 1.2% Native American, 0.8% Pacific Islander. 9.4% belonged to multiple races or declined to state the race.

Like many communities in the southwestern United States, Bonita could go through the process of hispanicization. According to 2008 SANDAG estimates, between 2000 and 2008, the number of Whites in Bonita dropped by 8%, and the number of Blacks, by 17%. At the same time, the Hispanic population in the community grew by 26%.  Hispanics now constitute the majority of the population of Bonita in all age cohorts under 40; they are far outnumbered (by a factor of 2 or more) in age cohorts over 50.

Notable people
Andrew Cunanan, American spree killer, lived briefly in Bonita as a child.

References

Census-designated places in San Diego County, California
South Bay (San Diego County)
Census-designated places in California